The Rose Ladies Open is a women's professional golf tournament on the LET Access Series, held in Hertfordshire, England.

The 54-hole stroke play tournament is hosted at The Melbourne Club at Brocket Hall, and was announced in July 2022 as a late addition to the LETAS schedule. At €65,000, it featured the largest prize fund of the season outside of the LETAS Grand Finale. It is the first LETAS event in England since the WPGA International Challenge which ran between 2013 and 2019 at Stoke-by-Nayland, and succeeds the inaugural English tournament on the LET Access Series, played at Hazlemere Golf Club in south Buckinghamshire in 2011. 

The tournament is supported by former world number one golfer Justin Rose, who together with wife Kate also launched the Rose Ladies Series in 2020.

English player Henni Zuël won the LETAS Ladies Open with a par on the first extra hole in a playoff with Ashleigh Simon, and My Leander of Sweden won the inaugural Rose Ladies Open, three strokes ahead of Noemí Jiménez Martín of Spain.

Winners

See also
WPGA International Challenge
Rose Ladies Series

References

External links

LET Access Series events
Golf tournaments in England